Footwork may refer to:

Footwork (cricket)
Footwork (dance)
Footwork (genre), a genre of electronic music, also known as juke
Footwork (martial arts), which includes boxing footwork
Footwork (racing team), an International Formula 3000 team
Footwork Arrows, a British Formula One motor racing team